Hajjiabad (also Romanized as Ḩājjīābād) is a village in Behdasht Rural District, Kushk-e Nar District, Parsian County, Hormozgan Province, Iran. At the 2006 census, its population was 67, in 16 families.

References 

Populated places in Parsian County